Frank Lucas (9 November 1888 – 31 August 1941) was an Australian cricketer. He played in three first-class matches for South Australia in 1919/20.

See also
 List of South Australian representative cricketers

References

External links
 

1888 births
1941 deaths
Australian cricketers
South Australia cricketers
Cricketers from Adelaide